Isauropolis was a Roman and Byzantine-era town in southern Turkey.

Possibly also known as Isaura Vetus, the city was in the Anatolian countryside of what was Lycaonia in today's southern Turkey and may have been the chief town of Isauria (Ἰσαυρία) district. The town was mentioned by Sozomen, Ptolemy, and Heirocles. 
About 450 Maximinus entered the town in his war with Zeno.
It must have been near Isaura Nova with which it was joined.

Bishopric
The city was also the site of an ancient bishopric which dates from the early Christian era.
Bishops from here attended both Council of Nicea and Chalcedon.  There is no  mention of Isauropolis in any Notitiae episcopatuum, so Ramsay supposes that the Diocese was joined with that of Leontopolis which is mentioned in all the "Notitiae". The see was resurrected in 1925 as a titular see of the Roman Catholic Church.

Known bishops
Ancient bishopric
Silvanus of Isauropolis at Council of Nicaea
Ilyrius of Isauropolis (Council of Constantinople 381)
Aetius, 451
Titular see
 Bernard Gozdzki  Auxiliary Bishop in Poznań (Poland-Lithuania)  July 6, 1722 – March 16, 1725.  
 Gregorio de Molleda y Clerque  September 26, 1725 – August 3, 1729  
 Louis-Mathias-Joseph de Barral  Coadjutor Bishop of Troyes (France) September 15, 1788 – December 22, 1790  
 Michele Di Pietro  (February 21, 1794 – August 9, 1802)  
 Jean-Louis Taberd MEP   Vicar Apostolic of Cochin (Vietnam) September 18, 1827 – July 31, 1840
 Dominique Lefebvre (Vicar Apostolic of Western Cochin) (Vietnam) December 10, 1839 – April 30, 1865.
 Tomás Badía  January 19, 1842 – September 10, 1844  
 Stanislas-Gabriel-Henri Baudry  Apostolic Vicar of Ningyüan (Republic of China)  March 18, 1927 – April 11, 1946.
 Jean-Baptiste Urrutia MEP  Apostolic Vicar of Hue (Vietnam)  February 21, 1948 – November 24, 1960.
 Philip Francis Pocock (February 18, 1961 – March 30, 1971)

References

Catholic titular sees in Asia
Populated places in ancient Isauria
Ancient Greek archaeological sites in Turkey
Roman towns and cities in Turkey
Former populated places in Turkey
Populated places of the Byzantine Empire
Lost ancient cities and towns